Hallie Taufo'ou (born 26 May 1994) is an American rugby union player. She plays for Loughborough Lightning in the Premier 15s.

Biography 
Taufo'ou made her international debut for the United States against Canada in November 2021. She was named in the Eagles squad for the 2022 Pacific Four Series in New Zealand.

Taufo'ou was selected in the Eagles squad for the 2021 Rugby World Cup in New Zealand.

References

External links 

 Eagles Profile

Living people
1994 births
Female rugby union players
American female rugby union players
United States women's international rugby union players